Little Heroes may refer to:

Little Heroes (band), an Australian band
 Little Heroes (album), a 1981 album by Australian band The Little Heroes
Little Heroes (novel), a 1987 science fiction novel
Little Heroes (film), a 1999 American TV film

It may also refer to:

Little Heroes Foundation, an Australian charity
The Little Heroes, an American rock band